The Pennsylvania Archives are a 138 volume set of reference books compiling transcriptions of letters and early records relating to the colony and state of Pennsylvania. The volumes were published in nine different series between 1838 and 1935 by acts of the Pennsylvania legislature. Contents of the archives include:
Letters between key government figures in Pennsylvania
Papers of the Governors

Marriage Licenses issued prior to 1810
Militia and Continental Muster Rolls including French-Indian War, Revolutionary War and War of 1812
Revolutionary Diaries
County Tax Lists (typically of the Revolutionary era)
Oaths of Allegiance
Ship Lists (compiling German immigrants during 18th century)
Land related records
Election returns

References to volumes 
Lost in Pennsylvania? Try the Published Pennsylvania Archives by Christine Crawford-Oppenheimer, M.L.S., 1999, The Genealogical Society of Pennsylvania
Guide to the Published Archives of Pennsylvania Covering the 138 Volumes of Colonial records and Pennsylvania Archives, Series I-IX by Henry Howard, Pennsylvania Historical and Museum Commission, 1949

Colonial records 
Vol I – Minutes of the Provincial Council 1683–1700
Vol II – Minutes of the Provincial Council 1700–1717
Vol III – Minutes of the Provincial Council 1717–1736
Vol IV – Minutes of the Provincial Council 1736–1745
Vol V – Minutes of the Provincial Council 1745–1754
Vol VI – Minutes of the Provincial Council 1754–1756
Vol VII – Minutes of the Provincial Council 1756–1758
Vol VIII – Minutes of the Provincial Council 1757–1762
Vol IX – Minutes of the Provincial Council 1762–1771
Vol X – Minutes of the Provincial Council 1771–1775
 Vol XI – Minutes of Supreme Exec. Council 1776–1779
Vol XII – Minutes of Supreme Exec. Council 1779–1781
 Vol XIII – Minutes of Supreme Exec. Council 1781–1784
 Vol XIV – Minutes of Supreme Exec. Council 1784–1786
 Vol XV – Minutes of Supreme Exec. Council 1784–1786
 Vol XVI – Minutes of Supreme Exec. Council 1789–1790
 Vol XVII – General Index to the Colonial Records

First series 
Vol I – Pennsylvania Archives Commencing 1644
Vol II – Pennsylvania Archives Commencing 1748
Vol III – Pennsylvania Archives Commencing 1756
Vol IV – Pennsylvania Archives Commencing 1760
Vol V – Pennsylvania Archives Commencing 1776
Vol VI – Pennsylvania Archives Commencing 1777
Vol VII – Pennsylvania Archives Commencing 1778
Vol VIII – Pennsylvania Archives Commencing 1779
Vol IX – Pennsylvania Archives Commencing 1781
Vol X – Pennsylvania Archives Commencing 1783
Vol XI – Pennsylvania Archives Commencing 1786
Vol XII – Pennsylvania Archives Commencing 1790

Second series 
Vol I – Minutes of the Board of War March 14, 1777 – August 7, 1777
Vol II – Pennsylvania Marriage Licenses Previous to 1790
Vol III – Persons Who Took Oath of Allegiance to the State 1776 – 1794, Papers Relating to the War of the Revolution
Vol IV – Papers of the Whiskey Insurrection of Western Pennsylvania 1794
Vol V – Papers Relating to Colonies on the Delaware 1614 – 1682
Vol VI – Papers Relating to French Occupation of Western Pennsylvania
Vol VII – Papers Relating to Provincial Affairs – 1682–1750
Vol VIII – Record of Pennsylvania Marriages Prior to 1810 Vol I
Vol IX – Record of Pennsylvania Marriages Prior to 1810 Vol II
Vol X – War of Revolution Battalions and Line 1775–1783 Vol I
Vol XI – War of Revolution Battalions and Line 1775–1783 Vol II
Vol XII – Muster Rolls of Pennsylvania Volunteers War of 1812 – 1814
Vol XIII – Pennsylvania in the War of the Revolution Associated Battalions and Militia 1775 – 1783 Vol I
Vol XIV – Pennsylvania in the War of the Revolution Associated Battalions and Militia 1775 – 1783 Vol II
Vol XV – Journals and Diaries of the War of the Revolution List of Officers and Soldiers 1775 – 1783
Vol XVI – The Breviate in the Boundary Dispute with Maryland
Vol XVII – Foreigners Who Took Oath of Allegiance to the Province, 1727 – 1775 and Foreign Arrivals 1786 – 1808
Vol XVIII – Documents Relating to the Connecticut Settlement in Wyoming Valley
Vol XIX – Minutes of Board of Property of Province of Pennsylvania Vol I

Third series 
Vol I – Minutes of Board of Property to Lands in Pennsylvania
Vol II – Minutes of Board of Property of Lands in Pennsylvania – Proprietary (Old) Rights
Vol III – Old Rights, Proprietary Rights, Virginia Entries and Soldiers Entitled to Donation Lands
Vol IV – Draughts of the Proprietary Manors of the Province
Vol V – State of Accounts of County Lieutenants During the War of the Revolution 1777 – 1789 Vol One
Vol VI – State of Accounts of County Lieutenants During the War of the Revolution 1777 – 1789 Vol Two
Vol VII – State of Accounts of County Lieutenants During the War of the Revolution 1777 – 1789 Vol Three
Vol VIII – Commissions Issued by the Province With Official Proclamations Vol One
Vol IX – Commissions Issued by the Province With Official Proclamations Vol Two
Vol X – Commissions Issued by the Province With Official Proclamations Vol Three
Vol XI – Proprietary Tax Lists of the County of Chester 1765, 1766, 1767, 1768, 1769, 1771
Vol XII – Proprietary Tax Lists of the County of Chester 1774, 1779, 1780, 1781, 1785
Vol XIII – Proprietary and Other Tax Lists County of Bucks 1779, 1781, 1782, 1783, 1784, 1785, 1786
Vol XIV – Proprietary, Supply and State Tax Lists of the City and County of Philadelphia 1769, 1774, 1779
Vol XV – Supply and State Tax Lists of the City and County of Philadelphia 1779, 1780, 1781
Vol XVI – Proprietary, Supply and State Tax Lists of the City and County of Philadelphia 1781, 1782, 1783
Vol XVII – Proprietary Tax Lists of the County of Lancaster County 1771, 1772, 1773, 1779
Vol XVIII – Proprietary Tax Lists of the County of Berks 1767, 1768, 1779, 1780, 1781, 1784, 1785
Vol XIX – Supply and Tax Lists for Northampton and Northumberland Counties 1772 to 1787
Vol XX – State and Supply Transcripts of the County of Cumberland 1778, 1779, 1780, 1781, 1782, 1785
Vol XXI – Returns of Taxables for County of York 1779, 1780, 1781, 1782, 1783
Vol XXII – Return of Taxables for the Counties of Bedford (1773 – 1784), Huntingdon (1788), Westmoreland (1783, 1786), Fayette (1783, 1786), Allegheny (1791) & Washington Counties (1786) and Census of Bedford (1784) and Westmorland (1783)
Vol XXIII – Navy and Line, Militia and Rangers 1775 – 1783 and List of Pensioners, 1818 – 1832
Vol XXIV – Provincial Papers Warranties of Land in the Several Counties 1730 – 1898
Vol XXV – Provincial Papers Warrantees of Land in the Several Counties 1730 – 1898
Vol XXVI – Provincial Papers Warrantees of Land in the Several Counties 1730 – 1898
Vol XXVII – Content of Vols I – XXVI and Index to Vols XI – XVI AA – CO
Vol XVIII – Index to Vols XI – XXVI CO – JU
Vol XXIX – Index to Vols XI – XXVI KA – RE
Vol XXX – Index to Vols XI – XXVI RE – ZY

Fourth series 
Vol I – Papers of the Governors 1681 – 1747
Vol II – Papers of the Governors 1747 – 1759
Vol III – Papers of the Governors 1759 – 1785
Vol IV – Papers of the Governors 1785 – 1817
Vol V – Papers of the Governors 1817 – 1832
Vol VI – Papers of the Governors 1832 – 1845
Vol VII – Papers of the Governors 1845 – 1858
Vol VIII – Papers of the Governors 1858 – 1871
Vol IX – Papers of the Governors 1871 – 1883
Vol X – Papers of the Governors 1883 – 1891
Vol XI – Papers of the Governors 1891 – 1897
Vol XII – Papers of the Governors 1897 – 1902

Fifth series 
Vol I – Officers and Soldiers in the Province of Pennsylvania 1744 – 1765
Vol II – Col. Thompson's Battalion of Riflemen June 25, 1775 – July 1, 1776
Vol III – Continental Line – Fifth Pennsylvania Jan 1, 1717 – Jan 1, 1783
Vol IV – The Invalid Regiment – Col. Lewis Nicola June 20, 1777 – 1783
Vol V – Associators and Militia Pennsylvania
Vol VI – Muster Rolls – Associators and Militia of the County of Cumberland
Vol VII – Muster Rolls – Associators and Militia of the County of Lancaster
Vol VIII – Muster Rolls – Associators and Militia of the County of Northampton

Sixth series 
Vol I – Muster Rolls – Associators and Militia of the City of Philadelphia
Vol II – Muster Rolls – Associators and Militia of the County of Washington
Vol III – Militia Rolls – 1783 – 1790
Vol IV – Military Abstracts from Executive Minutes Vols 1 – 9 Inclusive 1790 – 1817
Vol V – Muster and Pay Roll Pennsylvania Militia 1790 – 1800
Vol VI – Egypt Reformed Church Lehigh County 1734 – 1834 Translated
Vol VII – War 1812 – 1814
Vol VIII – Troops Under Cols Fenton, Rees Hill, Gens Harrison, Crook, Col Rush, Major Wersler and Those Who Rendezvonsed (sic) at Camp Dupont, Erie, Lancaster, Marcus Hook and York, Miscellaneous Rolls
Vol IX – Miscellaneous Papers – Drafted Troops 1812 – 1814
Vol X – Expenditures by the State of Pennsylvania on Account of the United States 1812 – 1814
Vol XI – Election Returns
Vol XII – Forfeited Estates
Vol XIII – Forfeited Estates Inventories & Sales
Vol XIV – Book of Dr Ewing to Settle Boundary, Orderly Books, Hand's Brigade Wyoming to Tioga, Early Petitions
Vol XV – Part I Index to Fifth Series – Armstrong to Lear
Vol XV – Part II Index to Fifth Series – Leard to Zwolley

Seventh series 
Vol I – Index to Sixth Series Aamnsburg to Dehl
Vol II – Index to Sixth Series Dehl to Holding
Vol III – Index to Sixth Series Holdman to Mickley
Vol IV – Index to Sixth Series Mickli to Shafer
Vol V – Index to Sixth Series Shafer to Zwernss

References

History of Pennsylvania